Pickens County Courthouse is a historic courthouse in Jasper, Georgia, the county seat of Pickens County, Georgia. It was designed by Bothwell & Nash and built in 1949. The exterior includes marble from Tate, Georgia. It was added to the National Register of Historic Places on April 29, 2008. It is located at 50 North Main Street.

Website 
https://pickensgacourts.org/

See also
National Register of Historic Places listings in Pickens County, Georgia

References

County courthouses in Georgia (U.S. state)
Courthouses on the National Register of Historic Places in Georgia (U.S. state)
Buildings and structures in Pickens County, Georgia
National Register of Historic Places in Pickens County, Georgia